Andrey Pyshnik (born 1 February 1968) is a former Belarusian footballer and currently a coach. From summer 2016 till the end of 2017 he was the head coach of Torpedo Minsk. Currently, he is the head coach of FC Minsk (women).

Honours
MPKC Mozyr
Belarusian Premier League champion: 1996

References

External links
 Profile at teams.by
 Profile at pressball.by
 Profile at Soccerway

1968 births
Living people
Footballers from Minsk
Soviet footballers
Belarusian footballers
FC Alga Bishkek players
FC Akzhayik players
FC Vitebsk players
FC Torpedo Minsk players
FC Ataka Minsk players
FC Slavia Mozyr players
FC RUOR Minsk players
Belarusian football managers
FC Minsk managers
FC Torpedo Minsk managers
Association football midfielders